Priday is a surname. Notable people with the surname include:

Rachel Lee Priday (born 1988), Korean-American violinist
Robert Priday (1925–1998), South African footballer
Thomas Priday (c. 1912-1939), British WWII soldier
Tony Priday (1922–2014), British bridge player and journalist